Nordland II is the twelfth and final studio album by Swedish extreme metal band Bathory. It is the successor to Nordland I. It was released on 31 March 2003, through Black Mark Production.

It was also released as a limited digipak.

Track listing

Personnel 

 Quorthon – all instruments
 Kristian Wåhlin – album cover artwork

References 

Bathory (band) albums
2003 albums
Viking metal albums